A number of standards prevail in Europe for trailer connectors, the electrical connectors between vehicles and the trailers they tow that provide a means of control for the trailers.

7 and 13-pin connectors 
The 13-pin  (ISO 11446)  version being phased in is newer, provides more services than the 7-pin  (ISO 1724) , a more positive locking and also better protection against moisture and contamination.

NEN 6120—Connectors based on ISO 1724 
Multicon Feder and Multicon WeSt (Welt Standard) connectors are precursors to ISO 11446  in a design that is intended to be compatible with ISO 1724. This means that if a towing vehicle has an outlet of this type it should be able to connect a trailer with a standard 7-pin or 5-pin connector according to ISO 1724, provided that the trailer coupling follows the standard and that the trailer plug casing is not made of metal since a metal plug will otherwise short the extra pins.

Both connectors have the same electrical wiring and can be found primarily in the Netherlands and Germany.

The following supplementary information exists for the connector:

Connectors of DIAB/VBG-typ 
These connectors are specially developed by :sv:Djurle Industri AB (DIAB) for severe conditions where snow, ice and salt are common. They can be equipped with an optional heating loop if necessary. Moreover, they are "self-disconnecting" to lower the risk of damage to the connector if the driver should forget to disconnect the plug when disconnecting the trailer or the trailer jumps off the hook.

The 14-pin, 17-pin and 22-pin connectors have the same physical dimensions, but different contact elements in the contacts.

These connectors occur primarily in Scandinavia, but vendors exist in the United States, Belgium and Great Britain, which means that they can be found outside Scandinavia as well.

Connections for these contacts listed as spare are free to use.

Maximum allowable current for ground contact is 25A.

12-pin DIAB P12 

This connector is designed for 12V electrical system where the standard ISO connectors are considered insufficient. The connector is designed in the same manner as the connectors for heavy vehicles, but is physically smaller.

The following supplementary information exists for the connector:

14-pin 

The following supplementary information exists for the connector:

17-pin 

This connector is used in cases where a 14-pin connector is insufficient

The following supplementary information exists for the connector:

22-pin 

This connector is a further development of the 17-pin connector for cases requiring support for many functions.

The following supplementary information exists for the connector:

See also

 Trailer connector
 Trailer connectors in Australia
 ISO standards for trailer connectors
 Trailer connectors in North America
 Trailer connectors in military organizations

References

Symbol Guide 

Automotive electrics
Trailers
DC power connectors